Sunnyside Farm is a farm near Kearneysville, West Virginia, United States, that is principally associated with William Fulk's dairy farming operation.  The farm has a full complement of buildings associated with dairying, including the main house (1914), smokehouse (1914), milk house (C.1899). a small log house, chicken house (1920), garage (1920), tenant house (1920), hog shed (c.1915), pig house (c.1899), barn (1911, reconstructed after a fire in 1985) and silo (1911).

References

Houses in Jefferson County, West Virginia
Colonial Revival architecture in West Virginia
Houses on the National Register of Historic Places in West Virginia
Houses completed in 1899
Farms on the National Register of Historic Places in West Virginia
National Register of Historic Places in Jefferson County, West Virginia
Historic districts in Jefferson County, West Virginia
Historic districts on the National Register of Historic Places in West Virginia